Sawanpracharak Hospital is the main hospital of Nakhon Sawan Province, Thailand and is classified under the Ministry of Public Health as a regional hospital. It has a CPIRD Medical Education Center which trains doctors for the MOPH-Mahidol CPIRD Program. It is an affiliated teaching hospital of the Faculty of Medicine Siriraj Hospital, Mahidol University.

History 
The Sukhaphiban Mueang Nakhon Sawan Health Station opened in 1931 to provide medical services for the sukhaphiban of Nakhon Sawan City. The name was then changed to Nakhon Sawan City Municipality Hospital, following a law passed to rearrange districts into municipalities. In 1950, the Ministry of Public Health took over hospital operations in regional areas from the Ministry of Interior and renamed the hospital Nakhon Sawan City Hospital, now with a capacity of 150 beds.

In 1965, the hospital received funding to expand the hospital to a capacity of 400 beds and purchase new medical equipment and this was completed in 1969. In 1970, King Bhumibol Adulyadej came to open the newly-refurbished hospital and graciously conferred upon the name 'Sawanpracharak Hospital'.

See also 

Healthcare in Thailand
 Hospitals in Thailand
 List of hospitals in Thailand
 Praboromarajchanok Medicine Program, Mahidol University

References 

Hospitals in Thailand